Mulgrave Tank railway station is a closed railway platform on the Richmond railway line in New South Wales, Australia. The platform opened in 1887 and closed in 1891

References

Disused railway stations in Sydney
Railway stations in Australia opened in 1887
Railway stations closed in 1891